"Sex" is a song written and recorded by American singer Lenny Kravitz and Craig Ross. The song was released on  August 6, 2014 as the second single from the Kravitz's tenth studio album Strut.

Background
Kravitz explained to Billboard, "This is one of my favorite tracks on the album. It was recorded with minimal instrumentation, guitar, bass and drums. The strength of the groove comes from the sparse production which creates space." To shoot the music video, Kravitz hired New York photographer and director Dikayl Rimmasch, who previously worked with Jay-Z and Beyoncé. The video is black-and-white and provocative: Kravitz performs the song surrounded by two topless female dancers, their hands hiding their breasts. The film crew is entirely made up of religious figures: the director is a priest, cinematographer a monk, lighting designer a good sister.

Reception
Marcus Floyd of Renowned for Sound wrote, "The album’s sophomore single Sex begins the show with its gnarly, enthusiastic arrangement and Kravitz’ vocals are as good as ever". Lanetra King of Rated R&B noted, "his soulful track “Sex” inspired by the groovy disco decade of flared bottoms and high hair fros. Kravitz welcomes the new generation and reintroduces the old to the 80s with his vintage, timeless sound. This track is sure to have listeners itching to pull out their dance moves on the floor... From the looks of his artwork for his “Sex” single and for his “Strut” album, Kravitz is sure to keep things hot and spicy for the new album."

Track listing

Charts

References

External links
 

Lenny Kravitz songs
2014 songs
Songs written by Lenny Kravitz
Songs written by Craig Ross